Delta time can mean:

 ΔT (timekeeping), the time difference between Universal Time and Terrestrial Time.
 Delta timing, a technique used in graphics programming.

See also 
 ΔT (disambiguation)